Samba Diouldé Thiam is a Senegalese politician from Matam. He is a member of the National Assembly of Senegal.

See also
Politics of Senegal

References

External links
Seneweb 

Members of the National Assembly (Senegal)
Living people
Year of birth missing (living people)